The architecture of Quebec City is characterized by its being one of North America (north of Mexico)'s oldest cities, founded in 1608. The original French settlers in the area built in an architectural style similar to the French style.

Quebec City was declared a World Heritage Site by UNESCO in 1985, and is the only remaining fortified city north of Mexico.

Quebec City has significant pieces of secular architecture, including hundreds of surviving heritage homes which have been built in the particular style of New France.  This style is an adaptation to the colder climes of Quebec of ancient 17th- and 18th-century house forms of Normandy and other traditional lands of the North of France.

Quebec City has always been a predominantly Roman Catholic city, with many Catholic churches, notably the Notre-Dame de Québec Cathedral, Notre-Dame-des-Victoires Church and the Basilica of Sainte-Anne-de-Beaupré in the nearby town of Sainte-Anne-de-Beaupré.

See also
 Culture of Quebec
 List of Quebec architects
 Architecture of Quebec
 Architecture of Montreal
 Architecture of Canada
 Society of Architectural Historians
 Canadian Centre for Architecture

External links
 Québec Religious Heritage Foundation
 Héritage Québec
 Archiseek Québec

Quebec